The following highways are numbered 48A:

United States
 Nebraska Spur 48A
 New York State Route 48A (former)
 Oklahoma State Highway 48A

See also
 List of highways numbered 48